Sébastien Delagrange (born 6 February 1974) is a French professional golfer.

Delagrange was born in Paris. He turned professional in 1995 and has spent his career fluctuating between European Tour status and playing on the second tier Challenge Tour. In 2001 he won the Nykredit Danish Open and the Aa St Omer Open on the Challenge Tour.

Professional wins (6)

Challenge Tour wins (2)

BeNeLux Golf Tour wins (1)

Other wins (3)
1997 National Omnium (French Tour)
1998 Franche-Comté Open (French Tour)
2001 Mauritius Open

Team appearances
Amateur
Jacques Léglise Trophy (representing the Continent of Europe): 1992
European Amateur Team Championship (representing France): 1993
Eisenhower Trophy (representing France): 1992, 1994

External links

Sébastien Delagrange at the French Golf Federation player guide

French male golfers
European Tour golfers
Golfers from Paris
Sportspeople from Pas-de-Calais
People from Boulogne-sur-Mer
1974 births
Living people
20th-century French people